The Fresh River is a tributary of the Weymouth Back River in Norfolk and Plymouth counties, Massachusetts in the United States.

See also
List of rivers of Massachusetts

References

Rivers of Norfolk County, Massachusetts
Rivers of Plymouth County, Massachusetts
Hingham, Massachusetts
Weymouth, Massachusetts